Rochetaillée is a commune in the Haute-Marne department in north-eastern France.

Geography
The Aujon flows north-northwestward through the middle of the commune. It crosses the two villages of the commune: Chameroy and Rochetaillée.

See also
Communes of the Haute-Marne department

References

Communes of Haute-Marne